The Robert Award for Best Short Fiction/Animation is one of the merit awards presented by the Danish Film Academy at the annual Robert Awards ceremony. The award has been handed out since 2006.

Honorees

2000s 
 2006:  – Benjamin Holmsteen
 2007:  – 
 2008:  – 
 2009:  –

2010s 
 2010: Megaheavy – Fenar Ahmad
 2011:  – Paw Charlie Ravn
 2012:  – Jeppe Rønde and Woo Ming Jin
 2013:  – 
 2014:  – Jens Dahl
 2015: Helium – Anders Walter and Kim Magnusson
 2017:  – 
 2018: Silent Nights – Aske Bang
 2019: '' –

References

External links 
  

2006 establishments in Denmark
Animated short film awards
Awards established in 2006
Fiction Animation, short